Günther Denzler  (born 26 February 1948 in Bamberg) is a German politician, representative of the Christian Social Union of Bavaria. He represents Bamberg (district).

See also
List of Bavarian Christian Social Union politicians

References

Christian Social Union in Bavaria politicians
1948 births
Living people
People from Bamberg